Welsh Newspapers Online is the searchable digital archive of historic Welsh newspaper holdings of the National Library of Wales. It is a work in progress and, over 1,100,000 newspaper pages from 120 newspapers were available free online, comprising over 15 million articles including news, family notices and advertising. The years covered are from 1804 to 1919, and a brief history and listing of relevant newspapers is provided. Copyright provisions are frequently described as "unknown" in the context of an otherwise explicit overall policy.

See also
 List of newspapers in Wales
 Media of Wales
 Media Wales
 NLW digital content

References

Archives in Wales
Internet in Wales
Mass media in Wales